Ese Hombre (Spanish: "That Man") may refer to:

"Ese Hombre" (Rocío Jurado song), 1979 song, also covered by La India in 1994
"Ese Hombre" (Nydia Caro song), 1983 song, also covered by Myriam Hernández in 1994
Por Ese Hombre, 1988 album by Charytín Goyco
"Por Ese Hombre", 1993 song by Pimpinela, covered by Brenda K. Starr, Tito Nieves, and Victor Manuelle in 2002
"Quitame Ese Hombre", a 2002 song by Pilar Montenegro from the album Deahogo